Li Da is the name of:

Li Renda (died 947), Five Dynasties period general and warlord, known as Li Da after 946
Li Da (philosopher) (1890–1966), Chinese Marxist philosopher
Li Da (general) (1905–1993), Chinese communist general
Eric Liddell (1902–1945), Chinese name Li Da, Chinese-born Scottish athlete and missionary